Rina Bjarnason (born 31 May 1964) is a Danish born Australian female handball player. She was a member of the Australia women's national handball team. She was part of the  team at the 2000 Summer Olympics, playing five matches. On club level she played for Monash University.

References

Living people
Handball players at the 2000 Summer Olympics
1964 births
Australian female handball players
Olympic handball players of Australia
Handball players from Copenhagen
Danish emigrants to Australia